Braemore is a rural locality in the Somerset Region, Queensland, Australia.

Geography
The Brisbane River forms the north-eastern boundary.

Road infrastructure
The Brisbane Valley Highway runs through from south-east to west.

References 

Suburbs of Somerset Region
Localities in Queensland